Ship to Gaza may refer to:

 
Ship to Gaza (Sweden), a Swedish organisation cooperating with the Free Gaza movement

See also 
 Gaza flotilla raid